Malko Tarnovo ("Little Tarnovo"; as opposed to Veliko Tarnovo) is a town in Burgas Province, southeastern Bulgaria, 5 km from the Turkish border. It is the only town in the interior of the Bulgarian Strandzha Mountains and lies in Strandzha Nature Park. Malko Tarnovo is the administrative centre of the homonymous Malko Tarnovo Municipality. As of December 2009, the town had 2,449 inhabitants.

Christianity is the dominant religion in the town, where an Eastern Orthodox and an Eastern Rite Catholic church exist. According to Lyubomir Miletich's demographic survey of the Ottoman province of Edirne in The Destruction of Thracian Bulgarians in 1913, published in 1918, before the wars Malko Tarnovo was a district centre inhabited by 1,200 Bulgarian Exarchist families and 80 Eastern Catholic Bulgarian families.

Before the Balkan Wars (1912–1913), Malko Tarnovo was a township (kaza) of the Kırklareli sanjak in Edirne vilayet as "Tırnovacık" that was ceded to Bulgaria following the wars.

Since 25 October 1913, it has been within the borders of Bulgaria.

Municipality
Malko Tarnovo is the seat of Malko Tarnovo municipality, part of Burgas Province. It includes the following 14 localities:

Gallery

References

External links

 Malko Tarnovo municipality
 Malko Tarnovo municipal website
 Website of the Malko Tarnovo regional court
 Malko Tarnovo at Journey.bg

 
Populated places in Burgas Province